The Freedom Brigade were a team of super-heroes active in the 1940s. They are best known as the parents of the incompetent Inferior Five.  Unlike their children, the Brigade were quite a formidable force against evil. Most of the Brigade members - namely Captain Swift, The Bowman, Princess Power, Mr. Might, and The Mermaid - were parodies of other DC characters, respectively: The Flash, Green Arrow, Wonder Woman, Superman, and Aquaman. The Freedom Brigade appeared only twice: in issues #62 and #65 of DC's "tryout" magazine Showcase.

History
In their first appearance, the retired Freedom Brigade members coaxed their offspring to band together as the "Inferior Five".

In their second appearance, they became instructors at Dean Egghead's Academy for Super-Heroes (a parody of Marvel Comics' Professor X and the X-Men).

Members
 The Patriot (Mr. Victor, first name unrevealed) - The Patriot comes from a family of heroes who, by the 1960s, had been fighting crime for 130 years. In fact, the Patriot is the son of Reed Victor, a.k.a. Yellowjacket who, with his partner Plato, had fought crime in the 1920s (this was a parody of the 1930s radio heroes named Green Hornet and Kato). When the Freedom Brigade retired, the Patriot married his teammate, Lady Liberty, and they gave birth to a son named Myron Victor, who later became Merryman, the bumbling leader of the Inferior Five.
 Lady Liberty (Miss Berkeley, first name unrevealed, later Mrs. Victor) - Lady Liberty also comes from a long line of heroes. For instance, her ancestor, Sir Chauncey Berkeley, fought tyranny in late 18th century France as the hero called the Crimson Chrysanthemum (this was a parody of The Scarlet Pimpernel). When the Freedom Brigade retired, Lady Liberty married her teammate, the Patriot, and soon gave birth to their son Myron.
 Captain Swift (Mr. Cramer, first name unrevealed) - Not much is known about Captain Swift, except that he is the father of Herman Cramer, a.k.a. the Blimp. Captain Swift's costume is almost identical to that of the Flash.
 The Bowman (Mr. King, first name unrevealed) - Nothing at all is known about the archer called the Bowman, except that he is the father of William King a.k.a. White Feather. The Bowman's costume is almost identical to the original costume worn by Green Arrow.
 Princess Power (birth name unrevealed, later Mrs. Tremor) - Not much was revealed about Princess Power, except than she was the mother of Dumb Bunny and wore a costume virtually identical to Wonder Woman's.
 Mr. Might (Barb-Ell of the planet Neon, alias Mr. Brent, first name unrevealed) - When the Freedom Brigade retired, Mr. Might married his teammate, the Mermaid. The Mermaid soon gave birth to Leander Brent, later called Awkwardman. Mr. Might claimed that he was born Barb-Ell of the planet Neon, son of Dumb-Ell. After the citizens of Neon ignored his warnings of their planet's pending destruction, Dumb-Ell sent his son Barb-Ell in a rocket to Earth. Neon never exploded.
 The Mermaid (birth name unrevealed, later Mrs. Brent) - Although nothing is really known about the Mermaid, it is clear she was intended to be of Atlantean origins. When the Freedom Brigade retired, the Mermaid married her teammate, Mr. Might. The Mermaid soon gave birth to their son, Leander Brent.

Enemies
 Dr. Evil - The Megalopolis police disbanded their mad scientist division after the Brigade ended his career.
 The Masked Swastika - Enemy of the Patriot and Hitler's top agent. The Inferior Five would later unmask the Masked Swastika, revealing that he resembles none other than Napoleon Bonaparte.
 Sparrow - Enemy of the Bowman.
 The Speed Demon - Enemy of Captain Swift.
 The Silver Sorceress - Enemy of Princess Power.

Retcons
 
Following the Crisis on Infinite Earths, much of the adventures of the Freedom Brigade needed to be retconned to fit in with the new continuity.  Only the revised history of Princess Power was ever revealed: in this version she was from a lost subterranean Amazon tribe discovered by Prof. O'Day. After she retired, Princess Power married O'Day, her true love. He believed he could handle living with a woman with super-powers, but discovered that he couldn't and left her after their daughter, Athena Tremor, was born. Prof. O'Day supported his daughter, but needed a more normal relationship. He married another woman, but she died soon after giving birth to his second daughter, Angel O'Day.  Princess Power returned and took the two of them in. The couple soon remarried.  Princess Power is now deceased.

References

Characters created by Joe Orlando
Comics characters introduced in 1966
DC Comics superhero teams
Parody superheroes